is a city located in of Ehime Prefecture, Japan. , the city had an estimated population of 31,385 in 15638 households and a population density of 240 persons per km².

Geography
Yawatahama is located in the western part of Ehime Prefecture on the island of Shikoku, at the base of the Sadamisaki Peninsula.  It faces the Seto Inland Sea to the north,  and faces Kyushu to the west across the Bungo Channel. The coastline is a ria coastline, with steep slopes, creating a scenic landscape where capes and coves intersect.  For a long time, the city's naturally good harbor has served as an important one for Ehime Prefecture and Shikoku.   Flat land is exceedingly sparse and the hilly terrain has been used for citrus production.

Neighbouring municipalities 
Ehime Prefecture
Ōzu
Ikata
Seiyo

Climate
Yawatahama has a Humid subtropical climate (Köppen Cfa) characterized by warm summers and cool winters with light snowfall.  The average annual temperature in Yawatahama is 15.5 °C. The average annual rainfall is 1644 mm with September as the wettest month. The temperatures are highest on average in January, at around 26.2 °C, and lowest in January, at around 5.1 °C.

Demographics
Per Japanese census data, the population of Yawatahama has been decreasing steadily since the 1950s.

History

The area of Yawatahama was part of ancient Iyo Province, and its name appears in early Nara period documents]]. According to legend, the name "Yawatahama" (八幡浜) comes from long ago when debris from a festival at the Usa Hachiman shrine (八幡) in Usa, Ōita, floated up on the beach (浜) in what is now Yawatahama.

In the Edo Period, the area was part of the holding of the Date clan of Uwajima Domain. After the Meiji restoration, the town of Yawatahama was established with the creation of the modern municipalities system on April 1, 1889. However, even before that time, Yawatahama was linked to Osaka and Oita via steamships and the area was referred to as the "Manchester of Shikoku" due to rapidly increasing industrialization.  The first bank in Ehime was opened in Yawatahama in 1878.  In addition, in 1889, Yawatahama was the first city in Shikoku to burn an electric light.

Town mergers
February 11, 1935 - Yawatahama combined with Senjo, Hitada, and Kamiyama and was elevated to city status.
February 1, 1955 - A locality of Futaiwa, as well as Hizuchi, Maana, and Kawakami were added.
March 31, 1955 - Nishiuwa District's  Isotsu, Miyauchi, Kawanoishi, and Kisuki towns merge under the name Honai.
March 28, 2005 - Yawatahama absorbed the town of Honai (from Nishiuwa District)

Government
Yawatahama has a mayor-council form of government with a directly elected mayor and a unicameral city council of 16 members. Yawatahama together with Ikata, contributes two members to the Ehime Prefectural Assembly. In terms of national politics, the city is part of Ehime 4th district  of the lower house of the Diet of Japan.

Economy
Major industries include citrus farming, fisheries, fisheries-related food processing, and shipbuilding. Mandarin orange cultivation is started in the middle of the Meiji era, and has a history of 100 years. The fishery industry is thriving with trawl fishing as the core, as well as aquaculture. The fish market in Yawatahama is the largest in Shikoku.Yawatahama's marine product industry extends beyond just fresh fish.  The town also specializes in fish products including fish paste and fishcakes made from pureed white fish.  This is known as kamaboko.  Yawatahama, along with Uwajima, have numerous shops selling a variety of kamaboko.  One local delicacy is jakoten (じゃこ天), or kamaboko fried tempura-style.Yawatahama's mikan production is governed by the Nishiuwa Agricultural cooperative, which is responsible for the distribution and branding of Yawatahama mikans.  This cooperative distributes the fruits nationwide under such brand names as "Hinomaru" (日の丸) and "Kawakami" (川上). However agricultural production is declining due to aging demographics and rural depopulation.

Education
Yawatahama has 14 public elementary schools and four public middle schools operated by the city government. The city has three public high schools operated by the Ehime Prefectural Board of Education.

High schools
Yawatahama High School
Yawatahama Technical High School
Kawanoishi High School

Junior high schools

Atago Junior High School
Yashiro Junior High School
Matsukaya Junior High School
Ōshima Junior High School
Honai Junior High School

Transportation

Railways 
 Shikoku Railway Company - Yosan Line
  -  -

Highways 
  Matsuyama Expressway

Ports

Port of Yawatahama - which provides regular ferry services to the cities of Usuki, Ōita and Beppu, Ōita on Kyūshū.

Noted people from Yawatahama
Moriyuki Kato, the governor of Ehime Prefecture
Chūhachi Ninomiya, a Japanese aviation pioneer
Maedayama Eigorō, a sumo wrestler who was the sport's 39th Yokozuna
Jōkō Ninomiya, founder and director of Enshin Karate

References

External links

 Yawatahama City official website 
 Yawatahama Sea Road 
 Yawatahama Mountain Biking 

 
Cities in Ehime Prefecture
Port settlements in Japan
Populated coastal places in Japan